= Jean-Maurice Verdier =

French jurist

President of Paris Nanterre University
- In office 1976–1981
- Preceded by: René Rémond

Personal details
- Born: 23 June 1928 Paris, France
- Died: 2 December 2018 (aged 90)
- Occupation: Lawyer; Professor

Jean-Maurice Verdier (23 June 1928 – 2 December 2018) was a French lawyer and professor. He once served as President of Paris Nanterre University.

== Biography ==
Verdier became Dean of Law and Economics at Paris Nanterre in 1970. In 1976, he became President of the university, a position he would hold until 1981. He was on the International Labour Organization Committee of Experts on the Application of Conventions and Recommendations from 1974 to 2000. He was also President of the International Society of Labor Law and Social Security until his death.
